Hugh IV of Burgundy (9 March 1213 – 27 or 30 October 1272) was Duke of Burgundy between 1218 and 1272 and from 1266 until his death was titular King of Thessalonica. Hugh was the son of Odo III, Duke of Burgundy and Alice de Vergy.

Issue
Hugh married twice, first to Yolande of Dreux when he was 16 and she 17 years of age. He then married Beatrice of Navarre, when he was 45. 
With Yolande, he had:
 Margaret, Lady of Molinot (1230s–1277), married first to William III, lord of Mont St Jean and then to Guy VI, viscount of Limoges; their daughter was the first wife of Duke Arthur II of Brittany
 Odo (1230–1266), who married Countess Matilda II of Nevers
 John (1231–1268), who married Agnes of Dampierre and had Beatrice, heiress of Bourbon
 Adelaide, who married Duke Henry III of Brabant
 Robert II (1248–1306), successor in the Duchy of Burgundy
With Beatrice, he had:
 Hugh, viscount of Avallon
 Margaret, lady of Vitteaux, wife of John I of Chalon-Arlay
Joan, a nun
 Beatrice, lady of Grignon (ca.1260–1329), who married Hugh XIII of Lusignan
Isabella, who married King Rudolf I of Germany

Expansion
Hugh IV, through a transaction with John l'Antique de Chalon, gave up the barony of Salon for the counties of Chalon and Auxonne in 1237, which expanded the Duchy and the regional economy benefited from the growing wine trade.

Barons' Crusade
In 1239, Hugh joined the Barons' Crusade led by King Theobald I of Navarre and supported by Frederick II, Holy Roman Emperor. The Burgundian troops allied with Richard of Cornwall and rebuilt Ascalon and negotiated a peace with Egypt in 1241. Hugh was made titular king of Thessalonica in 1266, although it had been recaptured by Epirus more than 40 years before.

Death
Hugh IV died on 27 October 1272 (Aged 60) at Villaines-en-Duismois, France. His burial place is unknown.

Ancestry

See also
 Dukes of Burgundy family tree

References

1213 births
1272 deaths
House of Burgundy
Titular Kings of Thessalonica
Dukes of Burgundy
Christians of the Barons' Crusade
Christians of the Sixth Crusade
Christians of the Seventh Crusade
Medieval child monarchs
13th-century peers of France